Temple Israel was once the largest synagogue in Silver Spring, Maryland. Located on University Boulevard in the neighborhood of Montgomery Knolls, it was an egalitarian synagogue associated with the Conservative branch of Judaism.

History
Temple Israel was founded in 1951 as a Conservative congregation, originally named the Langley Hebrew Congregation. Rabbi Lewis Weintraub was the synagogue's first rabbi. In 1952, the synagogue's building was constructed on University Boulevard. Sam Eig, a Jewish real estate developer, donated 10 acres to the congregation. A synagogue, library, social hall, and Hebrew School were built at this location. During its peak, Temple Israel was home to 750 families. About half of these families were headed by government employees who commuted into Washington, D.C. for work.

As part of the Soviet Jewry movement, the synagogue "adopted" two Soviet prisoners of conscience: Aleksander Feldman in 1976 and Amner Zavurov in 1977. Rosh Hashanah greeting cards were sent to Soviet Jews in 1975 and Simchat Torah greetings were sent in 1976. In 1979, English classes were held for Soviet-Jewish immigrants.

In the 1990s, changing demographics caused Temple Israel to make the "painful decision" to sell the synagogue building on University Boulevard. In 1997, Temple Israel merged with Beth Tikva (now Tikvat Israel) of Rockville, Maryland. Beth Tikva had been founded in 1959 as the Rockville-Wheaton Synagogue. As of 2022, the building that was housed Temple Israel is now home to Mount Jezreel Baptist Church, a predominantly black church.

References

1951 establishments in Maryland
1997 disestablishments in Maryland
Buildings and structures in Silver Spring, Maryland
Conservative synagogues in Maryland
Former synagogues in Maryland
Jews and Judaism in Silver Spring, Maryland
Russian-Jewish culture in Maryland
Synagogues in Montgomery County, Maryland